Manic usually refers to being in a state of mania.

Manic may also refer to:

Toponyms
 Manić, a suburb of Belgrade, Serbia
 The Manicouagan River in Quebec, Canada, often abbreviated to Manic
 Manic-1, a hydroelectric power station and dam at the mouth of the Manicouagan River
 Manic or Mányik, a village in the Chiochiș Commune, Bistrița-Năsăud County, Romania

Film and TV 
 Manic (2001 film), an American drama film starring Joseph Gordon-Levitt
 Manic (2017 film), a Canadian documentary film

Music 
 Manic Street Preachers, a band colloquially known as "The Manics"
 Manic (Halsey album), a 2020 album
 Manic (Wage War album), a 2021 album

Others
 Manic GT, a two-seater sports car made in Canada in 1969-71
 Montreal Manic, an NASL soccer team from 1981 to 1983
 Radivoje Manić (born 1972), Serbian footballer

See also
 Manik (disambiguation)
 Maniq